Players and pairs who neither have high enough rankings nor receive wild cards may participate in a qualifying tournament held one week before the annual Wimbledon Tennis Championships.

Seeds

  Robert Kendrick /  Alex Kuznetsov (qualifying competition)
  Florin Mergea /  Horia Tecău (first round)
  Johan Brunström /  Adam Feeney (qualifying competition, lucky losers)
  Petr Pála /  Igor Zelenay (qualified)
  Mikhail Elgin /  Alexander Kudryavtsev (qualifying competition, lucky losers)
  Jasper Smit /  Martijn van Haasteren (first round)
  Amer Delic /  Brendan Evans (qualified)
  Frederico Gil /  Dick Norman (qualified)

Qualifiers

  Amer Delic /  Brendan Evans
  Frederico Gil /  Dick Norman
  K. J. Hippensteel /  Tripp Phillips
  Petr Pála /  Igor Zelenay

Lucky losers

  Johan Brunström /  Adam Feeney
  Mikhail Elgin /  Alexander Kudryavtsev
  Hugo Armando /  Jesse Levine

Qualifying draw

First qualifier

Second qualifier

Third qualifier

Fourth qualifier

External links

2008 Wimbledon Championships – Men's draws and results at the International Tennis Federation

Men's Doubles Qualifying
Wimbledon Championship by year – Men's doubles qualifying